Pir-e Harat (also Romanized as Pīr-e Harāt) is a village in Khaleh Sara Rural District, Asalem District, Talesh County, Gilan Province, Iran. At the 2006 census, its population was 948, in 232 families.

References 

Populated places in Talesh County